The Man and the Moment is a 1918 British silent drama film directed by Arrigo Bocchi and starring Manora Thew, Hayford Hobbs and Charles Vane. It is an adaptation of the 1914 novel of the same name by Elinor Glyn.

Plot Synopsis 
An American heiress marries a Scottish aristocrat. She leaves him and goes to Italy, but later returns.

Cast
 Manora Thew as Sabine Delburg  
 Hayford Hobbs as Lord Michael Arranstoun  
 Charles Vane as Lord Henry Fordyce  
 Maud Cressall as Princess Morava  
 Peggy Carlisle as Miss Van der Water  
 Jeff Barlow as Armstrong  
 Kenelm Foss as Prince Torniloni

See also
Mad Hour (1928)
The Man and the Moment (1929)

References

Bibliography
 Low, Rachael. The History of British Film, Volume III: 1914-1918. Routledge, 1997.

External links

1918 films
1918 drama films
British silent feature films
British drama films
1910s English-language films
Films based on British novels
Films about weddings
Films set in Italy
Films set in Scotland
Films directed by Arrigo Bocchi
British black-and-white films
1910s British films
Silent drama films